The House at 753 East Broad Street is a historic house in Columbus, Ohio, United States. The house was built c. 1870 and was listed on the National Register of Historic Places in 1986. It was built at a time when East Broad Street was a tree-lined avenue featuring the most ornate houses in Columbus; the house reflects the character of the area at the time.

See also
 National Register of Historic Places listings in Columbus, Ohio

References

Houses completed in 1870
National Register of Historic Places in Columbus, Ohio
Houses in Columbus, Ohio
Houses on the National Register of Historic Places in Ohio
Olde Towne East
Broad Street (Columbus, Ohio)